Luis Javier Hernández Ortiz, aka Javy, is the current mayor of Villalba, Puerto Rico. He has been holding office since 2013. He is one of the youngest mayors of Puerto Rico. Hernández graduated with a Juris Doctor from the Pontifical Catholic University of Puerto Rico. He also studied International Law and European Community Law from the Ortega & Gasset Foundation in Toledo, Spain. He also holds a bachelor's degree in Forensic Psychology from the University of Puerto Rico. On November 16, 2019, his wife and the mother of their two daughters died after being diagnosed with Leukemia.

References

People from Villalba, Puerto Rico
Living people
Year of birth missing (living people)
Mayors of places in Puerto Rico
Pontifical Catholic University of Puerto Rico alumni
University of Puerto Rico alumni